Scott Adams (born July 10, 1952) is an American entrepreneur, computer programmer, and video game designer. He co-founded, with ex-wife Alexis, Adventure International in 1979. The company developed and published video games for home computers. The cornerstone products of Adventure International in its early years were the Adventure series of text adventures written by Adams.

Adventure International

Born in Miami, Florida, Adams had access to an advanced 16-bit computer at home, built by his brother Richard Adams, that gave him a jump on game programming in his leisure time. Adams wrote a graphical action game similar to Spacewar! on this system in 1975.

Scott Adams was the first person known to create an adventure-style game for personal computers, in 1978 on a 16 KB Radio Shack TRS-80 Model I, written in  BASIC. Colossal Cave was written two years earlier by Will Crowther, but on a mainframe computer (the PDP-10). These early text adventures recognize two-word commands of the form VERB NOUN. The parser only scans the first three letters of each command, so SCREAM BEAR, SCRATCH BEAR, or SCREW BEAR are treated identically. The games from his company, Adventure International, were subsequently released on most of the major home computers of the day, including TRS-80, Exidy Sorcerer, Apple II, Atari 8-bit family, Commodore PET, VIC-20, and ZX Spectrum. Later adventure games added graphics, with the text entry window below an image illustrating the scene.

Adams's work was  influential in adventure gaming. In 1990 Computer Gaming World reported a statement  by a "respected designer" that it was impossible to design new and more difficult adventure puzzles, because Adams had already created them all in his early games.

Later work
Since the late 1980s, Scott Adams has worked as a senior programmer for AVISTA in Platteville, Wisconsin.

In 2013, Scott Adams released the Bible-based The Inheritance, his first game in over ten years. As in most of his other games, the player is the protagonist of a novel-like story and helps events unfold in a text adventure set.  However, this new game also includes sound. In a 2018 interview Adams said he had not been happy with the game as it was released so had withdrawn it from the market whilst it was rewritten.

In July 2016, Adams created a new company called Clopas to begin publishing games in a new genre he called "Conversational Adventure Games". These games were similar to his early text adventure games, except that they now supported full natural language sentences. The first game he put out under company was Escape The Gloomer, a game published in collaboration with Soma Games for their  Lost Legends of Redwall series.

Games

Adventure International
 Adventureland (1978)
 Pirate Adventure (1979)
 Secret Mission (1979)
 Voodoo Castle (1979) in collaboration with Alexis Adams
 The Count (1979)
 Strange Odyssey (1979)
 Mystery Fun House (1979)
 Pyramid of Doom (1979) in collaboration with Alvin Files 
 Ghost Town (1980)
 Savage Island, Part I (1981)
 Savage Island, Part II (1981) in collaboration with Russ Wetmore
 Golden Voyage (1981) in collaboration with William Demas
 Sorcerer of Claymorgue Castle (1982)
 Return to Pirate's Isle (1983) exclusively for the TI-99/4A
 Questprobe #1: The Hulk (1984)
 Questprobe #2: Spider-Man (1984)
 Questprobe #3: The Fantastic Four (1984)
 The Adventures of Buckaroo Banzai Across the 8th Dimension (1984) in collaboration with Phillip Case

Later
 Scott Adams Scoops (1987) collection of earlier games published by U.S. Gold
 Return to Pirate's Island 2 (August 2000)
 The Inheritance (February 14, 2013)
 The Lost Legends of Redwall: Escape the Gloomer (2018)

Unreleased
 Questprobe #4: X-Men

References

External links 
 
Scott Adams interview, Adventure Classic Gaming, 1998
1986 CRASH magazine interview
Academic panel featuring Scott Adams
Adventure International Memorial

1952 births
American video game designers
Interactive fiction writers
Living people
Writers from Miami
People from Platteville, Wisconsin
Video game programmers